Guasipati Airport  is an airport serving the town of Guasipati in the Bolívar state of Venezuela. The runway is on the west side of the town.

See also
Transport in Venezuela
List of airports in Venezuela

References

External links
OpenStreetMap - Guasipati
OurAirports - Guasipati
SkyVector - Guasipati Airport

Airports in Venezuela